Chumikan Airport  is an airport serving Chumikan in Khabarovsk Krai, Russia. Per its flight schedule, accessed in December 2016, Khabarovsk Airlines serves the airport with flights to Khabarovsk.

Airlines and destinations

Accidents and incidents
 On 2 August 1973, an Antonov An-2R operated by Aeroflot suffered engine failure and crash-landed near Chumikan.

Notes

References

Airports in Khabarovsk Krai